FK Ozren is a Serbian football club from Sokobanja and currently competes in the Serbian League East, the third level of competition of Serbian football. The colors of shirts are dark green, light green and white.

History 
This football club was founded on July 21, 1912. FK Ozren through its long history of almost 100 years, went through various periods, has had its ups and downs and the greatest success in the new history of the club, is considered to be entering the Serbian League East in the 2002/03,2007/08 and 2013/14.

Seasons

References

External links
 at srbijafudbal.net
 at srbijasport.net

 
Association football clubs established in 1912
1912 establishments in Serbia